Estourmel is a commune in the Nord department in northern France.

Heraldry

Places of interest
It used to be well known by the families of the Cambrai area for its petting zoo, Le Parc d'Estourmel, which opened in 1967 and closed in 2013 ; it was located in the center of the village. It covered 6 hectares.

See also
Communes of the Nord department

References

External links

Official web site

Communes of Nord (French department)